Chatham is an unincorporated community in Licking County, in the U.S. state of Ohio.

History
Chatham was originally called Harrisburgh, and under the latter name was laid out in 1829. A post office was established under the name Chatham in 1836, and remained in operation until 1894.

References

Unincorporated communities in Licking County, Ohio
1829 establishments in Ohio
Populated places established in 1829
Unincorporated communities in Ohio